The Saint is the nickname of the fictional character Simon Templar, featured in a series of novels and short stories by Leslie Charteris published between 1928 and 1963. After that date, other authors collaborated with Charteris on books until 1983; two additional works produced without Charteris's participation were published in 1997. The character has also been portrayed in motion pictures, radio dramas, comic strips, comic books and three television series.

Overview
Simon Templar is a Robin Hood-like figure known as the Saint – from his initials, per The Saint Meets the Tiger, and the reader is told that he was given it at the age of nineteen. In addition, per Knight Templar:

Meet the Saint.
His godfathers and his godmothers, at his baptism, had bestowed upon him the name of Simon Templar; but that coincidence of initials was not the only reason for the nickname by which he was far more widely known.  One day, the story of how he came by that nickname may be told:  it is a good story, in its way, though it goes back to the days when the Saint was nineteen, and almost as respectable as he looked.  But the name had stuck.  It was inevitable that it should stick, for obviously it had been destined to him from the beginning.

Templar has aliases, often using the initials S.T. such as "Sebastian Tombs" or "Sugarman Treacle". Blessed with boyish humour, he makes humorous and off-putting remarks and leaves a "calling card" at his "crimes," a stick figure of a man with a halo over his head. This is used as the logo of the books, the films, and the three TV series. He is described as "a buccaneer in the suits of Savile Row, amused, cool, debonair, with hell-for-leather blue eyes and a saintly smile".

His origin remains a mystery; he is explicitly British, but in early books (e.g. Meet the Tiger) there are references which suggest that he had spent some time in the United States battling Prohibition villains. Presumably, his acquaintance with Bronx sidekick Hoppy Uniatz dates from this period. In the books, his income is derived from the pockets of the "ungodly" (as he terms those who live by a lesser moral code than his own), whom he is given to "socking on the boko." There are references to a "ten percent collection fee" to cover expenses when he extracts large sums from victims, the remainder being returned to the owners, given to charity, shared among Templar's colleagues, or some combination of those possibilities.

Templar's targets include corrupt politicians, warmongers, and other low life. "He claims he's a Robin Hood," says one victim, "but to me he's just a robber and a hood." Robin Hood appears to be one inspiration for the character; Templar stories were often promoted as featuring "The Robin Hood of modern crime," and this phrase to describe Templar appears in several stories. A term used by Templar to describe his acquisitions is "boodle," a term also applied to the short story collection.

The Saint has a dark side, as he is willing to ruin the lives of the "ungodly," and even kill them, if he feels that more innocent lives can be saved. In the early books, Templar refers to this as murder, although he considers his actions justified and righteous, a view usually shared by partners and colleagues. Several adventures centre on his intention to kill. (For example, "Arizona" in The Saint Goes West has Templar planning to kill a Nazi scientist.)

During the 1920s and early 1930s, the Saint is fighting European arms dealers, drug runners, and white slavers while based in his London home. His battles with Rayt Marius mirror the 'four rounds with Carl Petersen' of Bulldog Drummond. During the first half of the 1940s, Charteris cast Templar as a willing operative of the American government, fighting Nazi interests in the United States during World War II.

Beginning with the "Arizona" novella, Templar is fighting his own war against Germany. The Saint Steps In reveals that Templar is operating on behalf of a mysterious American government official known as Hamilton who appears again in the next WWII-era Saint book, The Saint on Guard, and Templar is shown continuing to act as a secret agent for Hamilton in the first post-war novel, The Saint Sees it Through. The later books move from confidence games, murder mysteries, and wartime espionage, and place Templar as a global adventurer.

According to Saint historian Burl Barer, Charteris made the decision to remove Templar from his usual confidence-game trappings, not to mention his usual co-stars Uniatz, girlfriend Patricia Holm, valet Orace, and police foil Claud Eustace Teal, as they were all inappropriate for the post-war stories he was writing.

Although the Saint functions as an ordinary detective in some stories, others depict ingenious plots to get even with vanity publishers and other rip-off artists, greedy bosses who exploit their workers, con men, etc.

The Saint has many partners, though none last throughout the series. For the first half until the late 1940s, the most recurrent is Patricia Holm, his girlfriend, who was introduced in the first story, the 1928 novel Meet the Tiger, in which she shows herself a capable adventurer. Holm appeared erratically throughout the series, sometimes disappearing for books at a time. Templar and Holm lived together in a time when common-law relationships were uncommon and, in some areas, illegal.

They have an easy, non-binding relationship, as Templar is shown flirting with other women from time to time. However, his heart remains true to Holm in the early books, culminating in his considering marriage in the novella The Melancholy Journey of Mr. Teal, only to have Holm say that she had no interest in marrying. Holm disappeared in the late 1940s, and according to Barer's history of The Saint, Charteris refused to allow Templar a steady girlfriend, or Holm to return. (However, according to the Saintly Bible website, Charteris did write a film story that would have seen Templar encountering a son he had had with Holm.) Holm's final appearance as a character was in the short stories "Iris," "Lida," and "Luella," contained within the 1948 collection Saint Errant; the next direct reference to her does not appear in print until the 1983 novel Salvage for the Saint.

Another recurring character, Scotland Yard Inspector Claud Eustace Teal, could be found attempting to put the Saint behind bars, although in some books they work in partnership. In The Saint in New York, Teal's American counterpart, NYPD Inspector John Henry Fernack, was introduced, and he would become, like Teal, an Inspector Lestrade-like foil and pseudo-nemesis in a number of books, notably the American-based World War II novels of the 1940s.

The Saint had a band of compatriots, including Roger Conway, Norman Kent, Archie Sheridan, Richard "Dicky" Tremayne (a name that appeared in the 1990s TV series, Twin Peaks), Peter Quentin, Monty Hayward, and his ex-military valet, Orace.

In later stories, the dim-witted and constantly soused but reliable American thug Hoppy Uniatz was at Templar's side. Of the Saint's companions, only Norman Kent was killed during an adventure (he sacrifices himself to save Templar in the novel The Last Hero); the other males are presumed to have settled down and married (two to former female criminals: Dicky Tremayne to "Straight Audrey" Perowne and Peter Quentin to Kathleen "The Mug" Allfield; Archie Sheridan is mentioned to have married in "The Lawless Lady" in Enter the Saint, presumably to Lilla McAndrew after the events of the story "The Wonderful War" in Featuring the Saint).

Charteris gave Templar interests and quirks as the series went on. Early talents as an amateur poet and songwriter were displayed, often to taunt villains, though the novella The Inland Revenue established that poetry was also a hobby. That story revealed that Templar had written an adventure novel featuring a South American hero not far removed from The Saint himself.

Templar also on occasion would break the fourth wall in an almost metafictional sense, making references to being part of a story and mentioning in one early story how he cannot be killed so early on; the 1960s television series would also have Templar address viewers. Charteris in his narrative also frequently breaks the fourth wall by making references to the "chronicler" of the Saint's adventures and directly addressing the reader. In the story "The Sizzling Saboteur" in The Saint on Guard Charteris inserts his own name. In the story "Judith" in Saint Errant is the line, "'This,' the Saint said to nobody in particular, 'sounds like one of those stories that fellow Charteris might write.'" Furthermore, in the 1955 story "The Unkind Philanthropist," published in the collection The Saint on the Spanish Main, Templar states outright that (in his fictional universe) his adventures are indeed written about by a man named Leslie Charteris.

Publishing history

The origins of the Saint can be found in early works by Charteris, some of which predated the first Saint novel, 1928's Meet the Tiger, or were written after it but before Charteris committed to writing a Saint series. Burl Barer reveals that an obscure early work, Daredevil, not only featured a heroic lead who shared "Saintly" traits (down to driving the same make of car) but also shared his adventures with Inspector Claud Eustace Teal—a character later a regular in Saint books. Barer writes that several early Saint stories were rewritten from non-Saint stories, including the novel She Was a Lady, which appeared in magazine form featuring a different lead character.

Charteris utilized three formats for delivering his stories. Besides full-length novels, he wrote novellas for the most part published in magazines, notably developing the character in the pages of the British story-paper The Thriller under the tutelage of Monty Hayden, who was developing the ″Desperado″ character type for the magazine, and these were later collected in hardback books collecting two or three stories per volume. He also wrote short stories featuring the character, again mostly for magazines and later compiled into omnibus editions. In later years these short stories carried a common theme, such as the women Templar meets or exotic places he visits. With the exception of Meet the Tiger, chapter titles of Templar novels usually contain a descriptive phrase describing the events of the chapter; for example, Chapter Four of Knight Templar is titled "How Simon Templar dozed in the Green Park and discovered a new use for toothpaste".

Although Charteris's novels and novellas had more conventional thriller plots than his confidence game short stories, both novels and stories are admired. As in the past, the appeal lies in the vitality of the character, a hero who can go into a brawl and come out with his hair combed and who, faced with death, lights a cigarette and taunts his enemy with the signature phrase "As the actress said to the bishop ..."

The period of the books begins in the 1920s and moves to the 1970s as the 50 books progress (the character being seemingly ageless). In early books most activities are illegal, although directed at villains. In later books, this becomes less so. In books written during World War II, the Saint was recruited by the government to help track spies and similar undercover work. Later he became a cold warrior fighting Communism. The quality of writing also changes; early books have a freshness which becomes replaced by cynicism in later works. A few Saint stories crossed into science fiction and fantasy, "The Man Who Liked Ants" and the early novel The Last Hero being examples; one Saint short story, "The Darker Drink" (also published as "Dawn"), was even published in the October 1952 issue of The Magazine of Fantasy & Science Fiction. When early Saint books were republished in the 1960s to the 1980s, it was not uncommon to see freshly written introductions by Charteris apologizing for the out-of-date tone; according to a Charteris "apology" in a 1969 paperback of Featuring the Saint, he attempted to update some earlier stories when they were reprinted but gave up and let them sit as period pieces. The 1963 edition of the short story collection The Happy Highwayman contains examples of abandoned revisions; in one story published in the 1930s ("The Star Producers"), references to actors of the 1930s were replaced for 1963 with names of current movie stars; another 1930s-era story, "The Man Who Was Lucky", added references to atomic power. Although Templar is depicted as ageless, Charteris occasionally acknowledged the passing of time for those around him, such as in the 1956 short story collection The Saint Around the World which features the retirement of Inspector Teal in one story.

Charteris started retiring from writing books following 1963's The Saint in the Sun. The next book to carry Charteris's name, 1964's Vendetta for the Saint, was written by science fiction author Harry Harrison, who had worked on the Saint comic strip, after which Charteris edited and revised the manuscript. Between 1964 and 1983, another 14 Saint books would be published, credited to Charteris but written by others. In his introduction to the first, The Saint on TV, Charteris called these volumes a team effort in which he oversaw selection of stories, initially adaptations of scripts written for the 1962–1969 TV series The Saint, and with Fleming Lee writing the adaptations (other authors took over from Lee). Charteris and Lee collaborated on two Saint novels in the 1970s, The Saint in Pursuit (based on a story by Charteris for the Saint comic strip) and The Saint and the People Importers. The "team" writers were usually credited on the title page, if not the cover. One later volume, Catch the Saint, was an experiment in returning The Saint to his period, prior to World War II (as opposed to recent Saint books set in the present day). Several later volumes also adapted scripts from the 1970s revival TV series Return of the Saint.

The last Saint volume in the line of books starting with Meet the Tiger in 1928 was Salvage for the Saint, published in 1983. According to the Saintly Bible website, every Saint book published between 1928 and 1983 saw the first edition issued by Hodder & Stoughton in the United Kingdom (a company that originally published only religious books) and The Crime Club (an imprint of Doubleday that specialized in mystery and detective fiction) in the United States. For the first 20 years, the books were first published in Britain, with the United States edition following up to a year later. By the late 1940s to early 1950s, this situation had been reversed. In one case—The Saint to the Rescue—a British edition did not appear until nearly two years after the American one.

French language books published over 30 years included translated volumes of Charteris originals as well as novelisations of radio scripts from the English-language radio series and comic strip adaptations. Many of these books credited to Charteris were written by others, including Madeleine Michel-Tyl.

Charteris died in 1993. Two additional Saint novels appeared around the time of the 1997 film starring Val Kilmer: a novelisation of the film (which had little connection to the Charteris stories) and Capture the Saint, a more faithful work published by The Saint Club and originated by Charteris in 1936. Both books were written by Burl Barer, who in the early 1990s published a history of the character in books, radio, and television.

Charteris wrote 14 novels between 1928 and 1971 (the last two co-written), 34 novellas, and 95 short stories featuring Simon Templar. Between 1963 and 1997, an additional seven novels and fourteen novellas were written by others.
In 2014, all the Saint books from Enter the Saint to Salvage for the Saint (but not Meet the Tiger nor Burl Barer's Capture the Saint) were republished in both the United Kingdom and United States.

On radio
Several radio drama series were produced in North America, Ireland, and Britain. The earliest was for Radio Éireann's Radio Athlone in 1940 and starred Terence De Marney. Radio Times dated October 11, 1940 refers to 'The Saint' Terence de Marney as the Charteris hero. Both NBC and CBS produced Saint series during 1945, starring Edgar Barrier and Brian Aherne. Many early shows were adaptations of published stories, although Charteris wrote several storylines for the series which were novelised as short stories and novellas.

The longest-running radio incarnation was Vincent Price, who played the character in a series between 1947 and 1951 on three networks: CBS, Mutual and NBC. Like The Whistler, the program had an opening whistle theme with footsteps.  Price left in May 1951, to be replaced by Tom Conway, who played the role for several more months; his brother, George Sanders, had played Templar on film. For more about the Saint on American radio, see The Saint (radio program).

The next English-language radio series aired on Springbok Radio in South Africa between 1953 and 1957. These were fresh adaptations of the original stories and starred Tom Meehan. Around 1965 to 1966 the South African version of Lux Radio Theatre produced a single dramatization of The Saint. The English service of South Africa produced another series radio adventures for six months in 1970–1971. The most recent English-language incarnation was a series of three one-hour-long radio plays on BBC Radio 4 in 1995, all adapted from Charteris novels: Saint Overboard, The Saint Closes The Case and The Saint Plays With Fire, starring Paul Rhys as Templar.

In film
Not long after creating The Saint, Charteris began a long association with Hollywood as a screenwriter. He was successful in getting a major studio, RKO Radio Pictures, interested in a film based on one of his works. The first, The Saint in New York in 1938, based on the 1935 novel of the same name, starred Louis Hayward as Templar and Jonathan Hale as Inspector Henry Fernack, the American counterpart of Mr Teal.

The film was a success and RKO began a Saint series. Some of the films were based on Charteris's original novels or novellas; others were original stories based upon outlines by Charteris. George Sanders took over the leading role. Sanders's offhand manner captured the urbane yet daring qualities of the Saint character, but after five films RKO assigned him to a new series, The Falcon, in which Sanders played the same kind of debonair adventurer. Charteris saw this as both plagiarism and an attempt to deprive him of royalties, and he sued RKO.

Hugh Sinclair replaced Sanders in 1941 and portrayed Templar in two films, both produced by RKO's British unit (the second film was ultimately released by Republic Pictures in 1943).

In 1953, British Hammer Film Productions produced The Saint's Return (known as "The Saint's Girl Friday" in the United States), for which Louis Hayward returned to the role. This was followed by an unsuccessful French production in 1960.

In the mid-1980s, the National Enquirer and other newspapers reported that Roger Moore was planning to produce a movie based on The Saint with Pierce Brosnan as Templar, but it was never made. In 1989, six movies were made by Taffner starring Simon Dutton. These were syndicated in the United States as part of a series of films titled Mystery Wheel of Adventure, while in the United Kingdom they were shown as a series on ITV.

In 1991, as detailed by Burl Barer in his 1992 history of The Saint, plans were announced for a series of motion pictures. Ultimately, however, no such franchise appeared. A feature film The Saint starring Val Kilmer was released in 1997, but it diverged in style from the Charteris books, although it did revive Templar's use of aliases. Kilmer's Saint is unable to defeat a Russian gangster in hand-to-hand combat and is forced to flee; this would have been unthinkable in a Charteris tale. Whereas the original Saint resorted to aliases that had the initials S.T., Kilmer's character used Christian saints, regardless of initials. This Saint refrained from killing, and even his main enemies live to stand trial, whereas Charteris's version had no qualms about taking another life. Kilmer's Saint is presented as a master of disguise, but Charteris's version hardly used the sophisticated ones shown in this film. The film mirrored aspects of Charteris's own life, notably his origins in the Far East, though not in an orphanage as the film portrayed. Roger Moore features throughout in cameo as the BBC Newsreader heard in Simon Templar's Volvo.

In July 2021, Paramount Pictures announced a reboot film, with Regé-Jean Page set to play Templar.

On television
The actor Roger Moore brought Simon Templar to the new medium of television in the series The Saint, which ran from 1962 to 1969, and Moore remains the actor most closely identified with the character. (According to the book Spy Television by Wesley Britton, the first actor offered the role was Patrick McGoohan of Danger Man and The Prisoner.)

Other actors played Templar in later series, notably Return of the Saint (1978–1979) starring Ian Ogilvy; the series ran for one season on CBS and ITV. A television pilot for a series to be called The Saint in Manhattan, starring Australian actor Andrew Clarke, was shown on CBS in 1987 as part of the CBS Summer Playhouse; this pilot was produced by Donald L. Taffner, but it never progressed beyond the pilot stage. 
Inspector John Fernack of the NYPD, played by Kevin Tighe, made his first film appearance since the 1940s in that production, while Templar (sporting a moustache) got about in a black Lamborghini bearing the ST1 licence plate.

Since the 1997 Val Kilmer film The Saint, there have been several failed attempts at producing pilots for potential new Saint television series. On 13 March 2007, TNT said it was developing a one-hour series to be executive produced by William J. MacDonald and produced by Jorge Zamacona. James Purefoy was announced as the new Simon Templar. Production of the pilot, which was to have been directed by Barry Levinson, did not go ahead. Another attempt at production was planned for 2009 with Scottish actor Dougray Scott starring as Simon Templar. Roger Moore announced on his website that he would be appearing in the new production, which was being produced by his son, Geoffrey Moore, in a small role.

It was announced in December 2012 that a third attempt would be made to produce a pilot for a potential TV series. This time, English actor Adam Rayner was cast as Simon Templar and American actress Eliza Dushku as Patricia Holm (a character from the novels never before portrayed on television and only once in the films), with Roger Moore producing. Unlike the prior attempts, production of the Rayner pilot did commence in December 2012 and continued into early 2013, with Moore and Ogilvy making cameo appearances, according to a cast list posted on the official Leslie Charteris website and subsequently confirmed in the trailer that was released. The pilot was not picked up for a series, but a large amount of additional footage was shot to complete it as the television film The Saint, released on 11 July 2017.

Films
Since 1938, numerous films have been produced in the United States, France and Australia based to varying degrees upon the Saint. A few were based, usually loosely, upon Charteris's stories, but most were original.

This is a list of the films featuring Simon Templar and of the actors who played the Saint:

 The Saint in New York (1938 – Louis Hayward)
 The Saint Strikes Back (1939 – George Sanders)
 The Saint in London (1939 – Sanders; produced in the UK by RKO's British unit)
 The Saint's Double Trouble (1940 – Sanders)
 The Saint Takes Over (1940 – Sanders)
 The Saint in Palm Springs (1941 – Sanders)
 The Saint's Vacation (1941 – Hugh Sinclair; produced in the UK by RKO)
 The Saint Meets the Tiger (produced in the UK by RKO in 1941, released in 1943 by Republic – Sinclair)
 The Saint's Return (1953 – Hayward) – aka The Saint's Girl Friday
 Le Saint mène la danse (1960 – Félix Marten)
 Le Saint prend l'affût (1966 – Jean Marais)
 The Fiction Makers (1968 – Roger Moore) – edited from episodes of The Saint
 Vendetta for the Saint (1969 – Moore) – edited from episodes of The Saint
 The Saint (1997 – Val Kilmer)

In the 1930s, RKO purchased the rights to produce a film adaptation of Saint Overboard, but no such movie was ever produced.

Television films
 The Saint and the Brave Goose (1979 made for TV – Ian Ogilvy) – edited from episodes of Return of the Saint
 The Saint in Manhattan (1987 made for TV – Andrew Clarke)
 The Saint – six 100-minute TV films, all starring Simon Dutton. Made for London Weekend Television (LWT) in the United Kingdom, it was postponed due to poor ratings, but went out as part of The Mystery Wheel of Adventure in the United States:
 The Saint: Wrong Number (21 July 1990, postponed from 14 July 1990 – Simon Dutton)
 The Saint: The Software Murders (4 August 1990 – Dutton)
 The Saint: The Brazilian Connection (2 September 1989 – Dutton)
 The Saint: The Blue Dulac (9 September 1989 – Dutton)
 The Saint: The Big Bang (28 July 1990 – Dutton)
 Fear in Fun Park, a.k.a. The Saint in Australia (14 July 1990, postponed from 16 September 1989 & 7 July 1990 – Dutton)
 The Saint (2017 made for TV – Adam Rayner)

Television series
This list includes only productions that became TV series, and does not include pilots.
 The Saint (1962–1969 – Roger Moore)
 Return of the Saint (1978–1979 – Ian Ogilvy)

Note
Three of the actors to play Templar — Roger Moore, Ian Ogilvy, and Simon Dutton — have been appointed vice presidents of "The Saint Club" that was founded by Leslie Charteris in 1936.

On the stage
In the late 1940s Charteris and sometime Sherlock Holmes scriptwriter Denis Green wrote a stage play titled The Saint Misbehaves.
It was never publicly performed, as soon after writing it Charteris decided to focus on non-Saint work. For many years it was thought to be lost; however, two copies are known to exist in private hands, and correspondence relating to the play can be found in the Leslie Charteris Collection at Boston University.

In comics

The Saint appeared in a long-running series starting as a daily comic strip 27 September 1948 with a Sunday added on 20 March the following year. The early strips were written by Leslie Charteris, who had previous experience writing comic strips, having replaced Dashiell Hammett as the writer of the Secret Agent X-9 strip. The original artist was Mike Roy. In 1951, when John Spranger replaced Roy as the artist, he altered the Saint's appearance by depicting him with a beard. Bob Lubbers illustrated The Saint in 1959 and 1960. The final two years of the strip were drawn by Doug Wildey before it came to an end on 16 September 1961.

Concurrent with the comic strip, Avon Comics published 12 issues of a The Saint comic book between 1947 and 1952 (some of these stories were reprinted in the 1980s). Some issues included uncredited short stories; an additional short story, "Danger No. 5", appeared as filler in issue 2 of the 1952 war comic Captain Steve Savage.

The 1960s TV series is unusual in that it is one of the few major programs of its genre that was not adapted as a comic book in the United States. It was, however, adapted as a comic strip in the British weekly comic TV Tornado (later merging with TV21), where it ran from 1967 to 1970, drawn by Vicente Alcazar. The strip was titled Meet the Saint in later issues.

In Sweden, a long-running Saint comic book was published from 1966 to 1985 under the title Helgonet. It originally reprinted the newspaper strip, but soon original stories were commissioned for Helgonet. These stories were also later reprinted in other European countries. Two of the main writers were Norman Worker and Donne Avenell; the latter also co-wrote the novels The Saint and the Templar Treasure and the novella collection Count on the Saint, while Worker contributed to the novella collection Catch the Saint.

A new American comic book series was launched by Moonstone in the summer of 2012, but it never went beyond a single promotional issue "zero".

In magazines
The original Saint novellas first appeared in  The Thriller (1929–1940), edited by Monty Hayden, a friend of the author, who was sometimes given a thinly disguised role in the early stories.  Charteris also edited or oversaw several magazines that tied in with the Saint. The first of these were anthologies titled The Saint's Choice that ran for seven issues in 1945–46. A few years later Charteris launched The Saint Detective Magazine (later titled The Saint Mystery Magazine and The Saint Magazine), which ran for 141 issues between 1953 and 1967, with a separate British edition that ran just as long but published different material. In most issues of Saint's Choice and the later magazines Charteris included at least one Saint story, usually previously published in one of his books but occasionally original. In several mid-1960s issues, however, he substituted Instead of the Saint, a series of essays on topics of interest to him. The rest of the material in the magazines consisted of novellas and short stories by other mystery writers of the day. An Australian edition was also published for a few years in the 1950s. In 1984 Charteris attempted to revive the Saint magazine, but it ran for only three issues.

Leslie Charteris himself portrayed The Saint in a photo play in Life magazine: The Saint Goes West.

Book series
Most Saint books were collections of novellas or short stories, some of which were published individually either in magazines or in smaller paperback form. Many of the books have also been published under different titles over the years; the titles used here are the more common ones for each book.

From 1964 to 1983, the Saint books were collaborative works; Charteris acted in an editorial capacity and received front cover author credit, while other authors wrote these stories and were credited inside the book. These collaborative authors are noted. (Sources: Barer and the editions themselves.)

Omnibus editions

In addition to the above, numerous paperback omnibuses compiling short stories and novellas have been published. Examples include Arrest the Saint (Avon, 1951), Concerning the Saint (Avon, 1958) and The Saint Cleans Up (Avon, 1959). In 1983, Avenel Books published the hardcover omnibus The Saint: Five Complete Novels, though this was actually three novellas and two full-length novels, combining the books Enter the Saint, The Holy Terror (a.k.a. The Saint vs. Scotland Yard), The Last Hero (a.k.a. The Saint Closes the Case) and Knight Templar (a.k.a. The Avenging Saint).

French adventures
A number of Saint adventures were published in French over a 30-year period, most of which have yet to be published in English. Many of these stories were ghostwritten by Madeleine Michel-Tyl and credited to Charteris (who exercised some editorial control). The French books were generally novelisations of scripts from the radio series, or novels adapted from stories in the American Saint comic strip. One of the writers who worked on the French series, Fleming Lee, later wrote for the English-language books.

Unpublished works
Burl Barer's history of the Saint identifies two manuscripts that to date have not been published. The first is a collaboration between Charteris and Fleming Lee called Bet on the Saint that was rejected by Doubleday, the American publishers of the Saint series. Charteris, Barer writes, chose not to submit it to his United Kingdom publishers, Hodder & Stoughton.  The rejection of the manuscript by Doubleday meant that The Crime Club's long-standing right of first refusal on any new Saint works was now ended and the manuscript was then submitted to other United States publishers, without success.  Barer also tells of a 1979 novel titled The Saint's Lady by a Scottish fan, Joy Martin, which had been written as a present for and as a tribute to Charteris. Charteris was impressed by the manuscript and attempted to get it published, but it too was ultimately rejected.  The manuscript, which according to Barer is in the archives of Boston University, features the return of Patricia Holm.

According to the Saintly Bible website, at one time Leslie Charteris biographer Ian Dickerson was working on a manuscript (based upon a film story idea by Charteris) for a new novel titled Son of the Saint in which Templar shares an adventure with his son by Patricia Holm. The book has, to date, not been published.

A fourth unpublished manuscript, this time written by Charteris himself, titled The Saint's Second Front was written during the Second World War but was rejected at the time; believed lost for decades, it emerged at an auction in 2017.

In popular culture 
 
In the 2003 BBC documentary series Heroes and Weapons of World War II episode titled "The Man Who Designed the Spitfire" (Episode 2) at approximately 18 minutes in the film an RAF pilot is seen at rest in his dispersal hut with a large Saint stick-man logo on his flying gear (see image at right). He is perhaps showing some personal identification with Simon Templar's own war against Germany in the novella Arizona.

In 1980 English punk band Splodgenessabounds released a single "Simon Templer" (misspelling intentional). It reached number 7 in the UK charts. The song appears mocking of the TV character, concluding "I think Simon's a bit of a bore/Ian Ogilvy and Podgy Moore.”

In 1962 students from James Cook University, Townsville, Australia abseiled down the pink granite monolith, Castle Hill and painted the character on its side as an act of patriotism, as the university had adopted the character as their mascot. At first, the local council (and some of the public) considered this vandalism and removed it, only for the students to keep repainting it. The council eventually gave up, and The Saint has been a permanent fixture since the 1970s. The irony now is that Queensland State Legislation states that objects older than 30 years old are eligible for cultural heritage status. This means that The Saint, originally a piece of graffiti, is now a Townsville Cultural Heritage icon.

References

External links

The Saintly Bible: large site about Leslie Charteris's creation (including news blog)
Official site for Leslie Charteris
The Saint Novels in French
Listing of all English-language Saint radio programs
Public domain recordings of Saint radio episodes in MP3 format, starring Vincent Price

 
Characters in British novels of the 20th century
Literary characters introduced in 1928
Fictional characters who break the fourth wall
Fictional con artists
Fictional amateur detectives
Fictional English people
Fictional gentleman thieves
Fictional vigilantes
Spy film characters
British novels adapted into films
British novels adapted into plays
Novels adapted into comics
British novels adapted into television shows
Novels adapted into radio programs
Male characters in literature